UHY may refer to:
 UHY Hacker Young
 Uhy (Kladno District)